Kamil Hasan Abdulla Ahmed Hasan Al-Aswad (born 8 April 1994) is a Bahraini footballer who currently plays for Al-Riffa, a top division football club from Bahrain, and the Bahrain national football team.

International career

International goals
Scores and results list Bahrain's goal tally first.

Honours

Club
Al-Riffa
 Bahraini Premier League: 2013–14, 2018–19, 2020–21
 Bahraini King's Cup: 2018–19, 2020–21
 Bahraini FA Cup: 2013–14

International
Bahrain
 GCC U-23 Championship: 2013
 WAFF Championship: 2019
 Arabian Gulf Cup: 2019

Individual
 Bahraini Premier League top scorer: 2019–20

References

External links
National Football Teams profile
Kooora profile

1994 births
Living people
Bahraini footballers
Riffa SC players
2019 AFC Asian Cup players
Bahrain international footballers
Sportspeople from Manama
Association football midfielders